Earl William Billings (born July 4, 1945) is an American actor, best known as Rob in the television series What's Happening!!.

Life and career
Billings was born in Cleveland, Ohio, the son of Willie Mae Billings.

He has gained recognition for his participation in ads for Aflac.  He has appeared in many television shows and films, such as Antwone Fisher (2002), American Splendor (2003), and Something New (2006).  He starred in the short-lived ABC show Miss Guided, co-starring Judy Greer and Brooke Burns.

Selected filmography
 Gosnell: The Trial of America's Biggest Serial Killer as Dr. Kermit Gosnell (2018)
 Parenthood as Pawn Shop Owner (1 episode, 2010)
 Cold Case as Eddie Clark '10 (1 episode, 2010)
 True Blood as Buster (1 episode, 2008)
 Miss Guided as Principal Phil Huffy (7 episodes, 2008)
 Senior Skip Day (2008) (V) as Lamar's Father
 Something New (2006) as Edmond McQueen
 How I Met Your Mother as Officer McNeil (1 episode, 2005 - "Sweet Taste of Liberty")
 Thank You for Smoking (2005) as Senator Dupree
 Rodney as Tom (1 episode, 2005)
 Fat Albert (2004) (voice) as Mr. Mudfoot
 Christmas at Water's Edge (2004) (TV) as Earl
 Without a Trace as Darrell Peters (1 episode, 2004)
 The King of Queens as Dennis (1 episode, 2004)
 Mr. 3000 (2004) as Lenny Koron
 ER (1 episode, 2003)
 American Splendor (2003) as Mr. Boats
 Antwone Fisher (2002) as Uncle James Elkins
 For Your Love as Milton (1 episode, 2002)
 The Guardian as Detective (1 episode, 2002)
 The Parkers as George West / ... (3 episodes, 2000–2002)
 The Proud Family as Photographer (1 episode, 2001)
 Ally McBeal as Ray's Client (2 episodes, 2001)
 Titus as Earl the Bartender (1 episode, 2001)
 Living in Peril (1997) as Detective
 Larger Than Life (1996) as Cop
 South Central (TV) as Mayo Bonner (8 episodes, 1994)
 Jimmy Hollywood (1994) as Police Captain
 In the Shadows, Someone's Watching (1993) (TV movie) as Allston
 One False Move (1992) as John McFeely
 Bustin' Loose (1981) as Man in Parole Office

References

External links

20th-century American male actors
21st-century American male actors
American male film actors
American male television actors
Male actors from Cleveland
African-American male actors
1945 births
Living people